Salikhovo (Sälix) is a rural locality (a village) in Isimovsky Selsoviet, Kugarchinsky District, Bashkortostan, Russia. The population was 87 as of 2010. There is 1 street.

Geography 
Salikhovo is located 23 km southwest of Mrakovo (the district's administrative centre) by road. Maloisimovo is the nearest rural locality.

References 

Rural localities in Kugarchinsky District